Blue Pacific may refer to

ASCI Blue Pacific, a supercomputer
Blue Pacific (album), a 1990 album by Michael Franks
Blue Pacific (Streeton), an 1890 painting by Arthur Streeton

See also
Partners in the Blue Pacific